Jack Yost (born October 12, 1945) is a former Democratic member of the West Virginia Senate, representing the 1st district between 2008 and 2016.

Electoral history

References

External links
West Virginia Legislature - Senator Jack Yost official government website
2008 Campaign Website Biography

Democratic Party West Virginia state senators
1945 births
Living people
West Liberty University alumni
People from Weirton, West Virginia
People from Wellsburg, West Virginia
21st-century American politicians
American United Methodists